In mathematics, Thaine's theorem is an analogue of Stickelberger's theorem for real abelian fields, introduced by . Thaine's method has been used to shorten the proof of the Mazur–Wiles theorem , to prove that some Tate–Shafarevich groups are finite, and in the proof of Mihăilescu's theorem .

Formulation
Let  and  be distinct odd primes with  not dividing . If  annihilates  then it annihilates .

References

 See in particular Chapter 14 (pp. 91–94) for the use of Thaine's theorem to prove Mihăilescu's theorem, and Chapter 16 "Thaine's Theorem" (pp. 107–115) for proof of a special case of Thaine's theorem.

 See in particular Chapter 15 (pp. 332–372) for Thaine's theorem (section 15.2) and its application to the Mazur–Wiles theorem.
Cyclotomic fields
Theorems in algebraic number theory